The nature reserve of Wollmatinger Ried – Untersee – Gnadensee is a protected area on the shores of Lake Constance in Germany. It has an area of 767 hectares and is the largest and most important nature reserve on the German side of Lake Constance. It is rich in plant and animal species and extends from the banks of the Seerhein river west of Constance via the causeway to the Island of Reichenau in the Untersee to the eastern Gnadensee near Allensbach-Hegne. The nearby offshore islands of  Triboldingerbohl (Langenrain) and Mittler or Langbohl (Kopf) are part of the reserve.

Literature

Sources 
 nabu-wollmatingerried.de: Das Wollmatinger Ried
 Regierungspräsidium Freiburg: Faltblatt zum Naturschutzgebiet Wollmatinger Ried

Reference

External links 

 www.nabu-wollmatingerried.de

Geography of Lake Constance
Nature reserves in Baden-Württemberg
Natura 2000 in Germany
IUCN Category IV
Konstanz (district)
Ramsar sites in Germany